Dadiya (Dadiya, Loodiya) is one of the Savanna languages of northeastern Nigeria. They are found in Gombe, Adamawa & Taraba state. The Dadiya people of Gombe State are found in Balanga local government, while those in Adamawa and Taraba are found spread in Lamurde and Karim-Lamido Local government area respectively.

The Dadiya communities and its inhabitants are globally represented by an Association called  Dadiya Community Development Association (DACODA). The Dadiya Elders Forum as well as other youth related associations playing role in the development of Dadiya includes the Dadiya Youth Development Association (DAYODA), the Dadiya Youth Development Foundation (DYDF) and Dadiya Success Forum.

The Dadiya peoples' king/ruler is identified as the 'Folo Dadiya' he lives in the Headquarters of Dadiya land, Bambam. The Dadiya people are friendly and accommodating, They live together with other tribes in peace in Bambam including the Waja tribe, Tula, cham and Tangale tribe.

Most  of Dadiya settlements are named  with a surfix "Loo" which means loosely mean settlements or  houses. Popular settlements in Dadiya includes Anguwan magaji, lookwila, lookulakuli, loogolwa, looja, lofiyo, lobasi, loofa, loodib, loobware other settlements are kafin bawa, Dogon dutse, Mai-tunku, Bambam, Balaifi, Tunga, Delifla, Sabara, Yelwa, Nasarawa among others.

Dadiya people have festivals which they use to display their culture, some are done every year while some once in a while like Yeelin, "KAL" which occur once in seven years.

Dadiya people are known to be farmers because of their mass and fertile land, they farm groundnut, rice, maize, beans, etc because the land is surrounded by rocks and mountains the Dadiya people believe that the land is blessed with lots of mineral resources.

The Dadiya people have no access road that connects the villages. The Nigeria government neglected the Dadiya land and their people because they do not have many of its people in the government that will lobby and bring development to Dadiya land. Once the rainy season starts, the Dadiya people are cut away from the rest of the world because of a big river that flows almost throughout the rainy season.

Dadiya people are open to any kind of positive development.

Distribution
Dadiya settlements were originally located in and around the Muri Mountains.

Muri Mountains (northern ridge, in settlements such as LɔɔKwila, LɔɔFiyo, LɔɔBwarɛ, and LɔɔKulakuli)
Loo Basin (such as in LɔɔTip and LɔɔFaa)
south of the Muri Mountains (settlements in the foothills, such as Tunga and Bollere)

Today, Dadiya is spoken in Bambam, where the 'Folo of Dadiya' lives in one of its wards.

References

Languages of Nigeria